The 1929–30 was Beşiktaş J.K.'s 11th official season and their 27th year in existence. Just like the previous year they finished 3rd behind Fenerbahçe and Galatasaray.

External links
Turkish Soccer

Beşiktaş J.K. seasons
Besiktas